Jannie Engelbrecht (born 10 November 1938) was a Springbok rugby player who represented his country from 1960 to 1969. He gained a reputation for tenacity as a result of scoring two tries during a vital 1964 provincial match despite having broken his collarbone earlier in the game.

Danie Craven described Engelbrecht as "one of the best wings to ever have played for South Africa", while others described him as fast and elusive "with the excellent change of pace". He held records for most appearances for South Africa as a wing (66) until 2006, and most career test tries scored by a South African (8) which was surpassed by Gerrie Germishuys (12) by 1981.

Early life 
Jannie Engelbrecht was born on 10 November 1938 to Attie and Joey Engelbrecht. His siblings included two brothers and three sisters. The elder Engelbrecht was a farmer who owned Kapel, a farm near Klawer in the Western Cape province of South Africa. Attie Engelbrecht contributed to organized agriculture and served on various religious and civil bodies. He died in about 1975, while Joey died in 1992.

Jannie Engelbrecht received his secondary education at Paul Roos Gymnasium in Stellenbosch, where he also played rugby on the wing.

Engelbrecht registered as an agricultural student at Stellenbosch University He lodged at Simonsberg Men's Residence, where he and two other students caused some consternation in 1961 when they "borrowed" two elephants from a visiting circus and brought it to the residence. In 1963 Engelbrecht became primarius of Simonsberg.

Rugby career

University career 
After playing in an intervarsity match for the university's third team alongside Mannetjies Roux, Engelbrecht was promoted to the first team.

Engelbrecht represented a Western Province Universities side in 1963 that won 11-9 against the touring Wallabies in Cape Town. He and Hannes Marais scored a try each in the match.

Provincial career 

Engelbrecht was first selected to play for Western Province in 1960.

In Western Province's 20-11 triumph at Newlands Stadium over the touring French team on 18 July 1964 Engelbrecht added a try to that scored by his teammate Dave Stewart.

Engelbrecht is often remembered for his heroics during the 1 August 1964 Currie Cup clash between Western Province and Blue Bulls in Pretoria. Northern Transvaal were the favorites, having beaten Province 29-5 in their previous encounter that year. Their forwards dominated the first 40 minutes of the game, and the teams restarted with the home side 6-3 ahead.

During the second half Engelbrecht broke his right collarbone after being tackled by Northern's captain, Louis Schmidt. Engelbrecht wanted to leave the field, but his captain, Doug Hopwood, refused. At the time substitutions were not permitted, and Province would have had to continue play with 14 men. Engelbrecht later recalled that the pain was so severe that he wanted to avoid at all costs being tackled again. Spurred by this urgency, he twice ran around the opposition to score, contributing to Province's 16-11 victory and claim to the Currie Cup. Schmidt had to suffer the ignominy of being booed by his home crowd as he left the field. He was dropped after the match and retired at the age of 27.

International career 
Still only 20, Engelbrecht was called up for the 1959 Junior Springbok team that toured Argentina in August and September. The Junior Springboks comprised young players on the verge of making their international debuts. Captained by lock Peter Allen, the team won all 13 of their matches, including two in Buenos Aires against the local national team which featured Stanley and Ricardo Hogg.

Engelbrecht's international career proper started with his selection for the first test against a touring Scottish team on 30 April 1960. He joined 9 other debutants at the EPRU Stadium in Port Elizabeth, including Doug Hopwood and John Gainsford.

The test occurred in the midst of the state of emergency that had been declared on 30 March, following the Sharpeville massacre on 21 March, and which lasted until 31 August. During that period some 20,000 black South Africans would be detained. In the pre-dawn hours before the test government forces arrested 445 people in the townships around Port Elizabeth 

The Glasgow Herald noted Craven's prediction of victory for the touring side but nevertheless favoured the untried Springboks. Scottish hopes were pinned on the greater fitness of their team and mobility of their pack. Engelbrecht was viewed as "a danger man with great pace and outside swerve". Danie Craven later recalled that Engelbrecht had injured his shoulder beforehand, and that Craven had to bandage the limb before the wing took to the field. In the event, the experience that 6 of the Springboks had gained on the 1959 Junior Springbok tour to Argentina was reflected in the home side's 18-10 win.

In all Engelbrecht would play 67 times for the Springboks and score 44 tries. In 1965 he scored a hat-trick for the national side against a combined New Zealand regional side at Timaru, and in 1968 he produced 4 tries in a win over a French select team in Toulon.

Engelbrecht celebrated his last appearance in the Springbok jersey on 16 August 1969 with two tries in the 2nd test against Australia at Kings Park in Durban. Strong winds hindered play, and for the first 18 minutes neither side could gain territorial dominance. Then Engelbrecht managed to snag a loose ball and score after Wallaby captain Greg Davis tried to kick from within his 22m area. His second try followed a scrum won by the Springboks near the touch line. Left wing Syd Nomis cut into the backline to create an overlap and Engelbrecht scored after receiving the ball from Mannetjies Roux, who had drawn the last defender. The test gained some notoriety in the Australian press as Craven allegedly said at the after-game reception that playing the Wallabies was like playing schoolboys, to which the Australian team responded by heckling him.

Test history

Rugby administration

Engelbrecht served on the executive committee of the Western Province Rugby Union, of which he was elected junior vice-president in 1992. He also sat on the executive for his university's club, the Stellenbosch Rugby Football Club, while Danie Craven was chair. After Craven's death, Engelbrecht assumed leadership of Stellenbosch RFC from 1993 until his resignation in 2004.

In March 1993 he was appointed Springbok manager for the incoming tour by France and the outgoing tour to Australia, alongside new coach Ian McIntosh, and in April 1994 his contract was extended to the end of the 1995 Rugby World Cup. Lauded for the relaxed and open style that he brought to the position,  Engelbrecht spoke out several times against dirty play by South African players. Series losses to France (1993), Australia (1993), and New Zealand (1994), led to the firing of the new manager and coach by Louis Luyt, president of the South African Rugby Union. Engelbrecht's disagreements with Luyt about the latter's interventions also played a role in this regard. While McIntosh demurred mildly at his dismissal, Engelbrecht was far more outspoken, blaming Luyt's ego for the fracas and the subsequent results.

Personal life 
On 7 December 1963 Engelbrecht married the Namibian Ellen Liebenberg in Windhoek. Earlier that year Ellen had won the Miss South Africa beauty pageant and in July was a semi-finalist at the Miss Universe competition in Miami Beach, Florida. Their children include Angeline (daughter), Jean (son), and Magdeline (daughter). The couple divorced in 2004 after Engelbrecht had had an extra-marital affair.

See also
List of South Africa national rugby union players – Springbok no. 347

References

1938 births
Western Province (rugby union) players
South Africa international rugby union players
South African rugby union players
Rugby union wings
Living people
Rugby union players from Cape Town